Vadim Yusupovich Abdrashitov (19 January 1945 – 12 February 2023) was a Russian film director. He was internationally renowned as one of Russian cinema's most notable independent directors, with awards from the Berlin and Venice Film Festivals, and was a People's Artist of Russia.

Early life and education
Abdrashitov was born in Ukraine to Tatar father and Russian mother. He moved all over the Soviet Union with his father's military assignments.

Abdrashitov was so impressed with the space flight of the first Russian cosmonaut that he left his parents and moved to Moscow to study nuclear physics at the Moscow Institute of Physics and Technology. Around that time, he developed an interest in amateur filmmaking, and he transferred to the Мendeleev University of Chemical Technology because it was equipped with a film studio for students. His cultural and artistic interests developed during the "Thaw".

After graduation as an engineer, he worked as a manager at the Moscow Electric-Vacuum Industry, which was making colour TV tubes.

From 1970 to 1974, Abdrashitov studied film directing at the Moscow Institute of Cinematography (Gerasimov Institute).

Career

Abdrashitov's directorial debut was  Stop Potapov! (1974), a satirical comedy based on the screenplay by Grigori Gorin. In 1975 Abdrashitov met with the unknown writer Aleksandr Mindadze, which began a collaboration that lasted for the next 12 films over 30 years.

His 1997 film Time of a Dancer was shown in the Stalker Human Rights Film Festival's regional presentation in Rostov-on-Don in 2010, where he engaged in discussion with the audience.

Themes and style
Abdrashitov's films are often characterized by protagonists delving into self-exploration. His films have uncomfortable, challenging and intellectual themes; however, the director avoids depiction of graphic violence in all his films. Instead, misery is alluded to in more creative and at times surrealist ways.

Other roles
In 1990, he was a member of the jury at the 40th Berlin International Film Festival.

In 2016, he became a member of the Board of Trustees for the Fazil Iskander International Literary Award.

Abdrashitov also acted as the president of the Russian Guild of Film Directors and the Stalker Human Rights Film Festival..

Personal life and death
Abdrashitov was married to artist Natella Toidze, a member of the Russian Academy of Arts.

Abdrashitov died on 12 February 2023, at the age of 78.

Awards and honours
People's Artist of Russia
1987: President of the Italian Senate's Gold Medal  at the 44th edition of the Venice Film Festival,  for  Plumbum, or The Dangerous Game
1989: Alfred Bauer Prize at the 39th Berlin International Film Festival, for The Servant
1991: USSR State Prize, for The Servant
1995: Silver Bear at the 45th Berlin International Film Festival, for A Play for a Passenger
1996: Several Nika Awards as well as the Grand Prix at Kinotavr, for Time of a Dancer
2003: Nika Award, Best Director for Magnetic Storms

Selected filmography
Speech for the Defence (1976)
The Turning Point (1978)
Fox Hunting (1980)
The Train Has Stopped (1982)
Planet Parade (1984)
Plumbum, or The Dangerous Game (1987)
The Servant (1989)
A Play for a Passenger (1995)
Time of a Dancer (1996)

References

External links

1945 births
2023 deaths
D. Mendeleev University of Chemical Technology of Russia alumni
Academic staff of High Courses for Scriptwriters and Film Directors
Tatar people of Russia
Soviet film directors
Russian film directors
Honorary Members of the Russian Academy of Arts
Academicians of the Russian Academy of Cinema Arts and Sciences "Nika"
Academic staff of the Gerasimov Institute of Cinematography
Russian people of Ukrainian descent
Volga Tatar people
Recipients of the USSR State Prize
Recipients of the Lenin Komsomol Prize
People's Artists of Russia
Gerasimov Institute of Cinematography alumni
Recipients of the Nika Award
Recipients of the Vasilyev Brothers State Prize of the RSFSR
Recipients of the Order "For Merit to the Fatherland", 4th class